Wilson Gomes Carneiro (born 3 July 1930) is a Brazilian hurdler. He competed in the men's 400 metres hurdles at the 1952 Summer Olympics. He was also the first Brazilian individual medalist at the Pan American games, winning the silver medal in the 400 meters hurdles in the 1951 Pan American Games in Buenos Aires.

References

1930 births
Living people
Athletes (track and field) at the 1952 Summer Olympics
Brazilian male hurdlers
Olympic athletes of Brazil
Athletes from Rio de Janeiro (city)
Pan American Games medalists in athletics (track and field)
Pan American Games silver medalists for Brazil
Pan American Games bronze medalists for Brazil
Athletes (track and field) at the 1951 Pan American Games
Athletes (track and field) at the 1955 Pan American Games
Athletes (track and field) at the 1959 Pan American Games
Medalists at the 1951 Pan American Games
Medalists at the 1955 Pan American Games